Eublemma cinnamomea is a species of moth of the family Erebidae first described by Gottlieb August Wilhelm Herrich-Schäffer in 1868. It is widespread in the New World tropics from the southern United States south to Argentina.

The wingspan is about 17 mm.

References

Moths described in 1868
Boletobiinae